The life cycle of the tiger is based on a reactive reproductive strategy, which allows a very flexible population dynamics with respect to the environment: many cubs are born, but very few survive up to adulthood. At birth, the tiger is blind and therefore very vulnerable, depends entirely on its mother. Learning to hunt takes a year and a half: the cub discovers its future hunting life through observation of the tigress.

The sexually matured tiger seeks to mate with a female, following the typical feline pattern: when the tigress accepts the male, he mounts her and holds her by the scruff of the neck. The female tries to hit the male when coitus is over. Mating is rapid and is repeated several times a day for a maximum of ten days. Gestation averagely lasts 103 days.

The longevity of the tiger is about fifteen years in the wild and twenty-six years in captivity. On average, only two offspring are introduced into the wild breeding population. In zoos, the cycle is modified by human assistance: caesarean sections, artificial insemination or hybridisation with other species can alter it.

Birth and upbringing

Early days 
Cubs remain blind for six to fourteen days because a membrane covers their eyes. When their eyes are "open" they are blue; they will change colour as they grow to a dark golden colour. Cubs are also naked and unable to walk. They weigh between 750 and 1,600 g at birth, depending on the subspecies: the newborn tiger is 200 times lighter than the adult tiger.

Three to thirty minutes after birth, when the first cry is heard, the tigress frees the cubs from the umbilical cord and cleans them. Attracted by the warmth of their mother's body, the blind newborns then grope for the teats. Breastfeeding begins during the first four hours, and the first three days are devoted to this. Initially, 70% of the day's hours are devoted to suckling, but this decreases to 60% after ten days, 30% after forty days, and only 10% at 90 days, when the young tigers are almost fully weaned. The tigress will quickly lose interest in unmoving cubs, which are considered stillborn, and will not force her cubs to feed. The tigress's milk is very rich in lipids and protein, which ensures rapid growth: the tiger multiplies its weight by a hundred during the first twenty months, with growth continuing more slowly until it is two years old.

The tigress does not hesitate to move her cubs frequently from one den to another to protect them from potential predators. Cubs begin to play from one month of age. Each litter usually has a dominant youngster, which is usually a male, although this is not always the case. To protect her cubs, the female brings the prey to the den so she can eat while keeping an eye on her offspring. However, the den is kept clean: meat does not enter the den, and defecation and urination are done outside the den. The cubs are constantly licked to keep them clean; this also improves blood flow and the functioning of the cubs' intestines.

Upbringing 

The female alone is responsible for raising the cubs; the male is almost never involved, although he sometimes shares prey with the tigress and her offspring. The tigress does not allow her offspring to touch meat until they are forty days old; she then encourages them to lick and chew it, and they are completely weaned by the time they are eight months old. At three months old, she starts leaving them alone for several days in the den while she hunts, then takes them to the carcass of the animal she has killed. Unlike young lions, young tigers eat before their mothers, and it is only when they are full that the tigress begins to eat: experiments on wild and captive tigers have shown that even when hungry, the tigress will let her litter eat first. The tigress is also very protective and will eliminate or avoid any danger (male tigers, including the father, men, etc.).

The cubs stay with their mothers to learn to hunt until they are eighteen to twenty-eight months old. Young tigers learn to hunt by watching their mothers. They enjoy tracking and killing dangerous prey, such as the buffalo. Between six and eight months of age, the cubs explore the terrain and stalk small animals: these are usually birds, but they sometimes attack small deer in groups. At this age, they never stray more than 100 meters from the mother. Some felines, notably the female cheetah, will capture live prey at a very young age and offer it to her offspring as "real-time" hunting practice. This type of behaviour is much less common with tigers. At around one year of age, the cubs are able to hunt on their own.

The permanent dentition of tigers, which appears between 12 and 18 months, allows them to become very efficient hunters. Conflicts over prey increase at around 18 to 21 months of age and males are the first to leave the family circle. This union is disturbed when the tigress goes into estrus again and leaves the rest of her litter.

Reproduction

Reproduction strategy 

The reproductive strategy of the tiger is defined as r-type, i.e. reactive. This strategy is based on the birth of many cubs, often immature. Parental investment is low, the cubs grow rapidly, and the individuals quickly reach sexual maturity. The population is likely to vary greatly depending on various factors such as the environment, the quantity of food, etc. This type of strategy is typical of rodents and small mammals.

The tiger is not a 100% r-type species: it is a large animal and takes two years to grow to adult size. Learning to hunt also requires a lot of support from the mother so that her offspring can survive on their own.

This strategy allows the tiger to quickly recover its populations, even after large losses. One indication of this ability is from the periods when tiger hunting was allowed, for which records remain. For example, in 1933, forty-seven tigers were shot in Chitawan district, yet in 1936, fifty-nine more were killed in the same area: the population quickly "sustained" the casualties. Only one long-term study of tiger population growth exists. Conducted in Russia since 1963 in a region that was then devoid of tigers, it shows that the first tiger arrived in 1966, and that the population grew by more than twenty individuals in the space of twenty-eight years, with an average annual growth rate of 6%.

Mating 

In the wild, tigers reach sexual maturity at three to six years of age for males and around three years for females. First reproduction occurs at around three to four years for females and four to eight years for males on average.

The breeding season can occur at any time of the year, but there is a peak which varies according to the geographical area: late November and early April in India, December and February in Manchuria and February and April in Nepal. A study of captive tigers showed that semen production and quality do not vary with the seasons. Estrus lasts nine days on average. The cycle resumes every 15 to 20 days in the wild, compared to about 40 days in captivity. When a litter is lost, the next estrus occurs earlier, after an average of two weeks for captive individuals. Although possible false estrus has been reported in Ranthambore National Park, this behaviour has not been valid with tigers. When the female is in estrus (also known as being in heat, or in heat, as in the domestic cat), she signals her presence by repeated moaning and roaring accompanied by more frequent scent marking than usual. The tigress' vocalisations can be very frequent, up to 69 roars every fifteen minutes.

When the female meets an unfamiliar male, she is at first distant, growling at him and ready to attack, but the pair gradually move closer together until they touch moustaches. During courtship, contact is frequent: the tigers bite each other's mouths as a "kiss" and rub against each other. When the female is ready, she adopts the typical feline position of lying down (a position called lordosis, with her front legs extended in front of her and her back legs half-bent). The tiger mounts her in a half-crouched position that does not crush her partner. The male penetrates the female, makes a metallic sounding cry and then grabs her by the folds of the skin at the back of the neck during ejaculation. It is possible that this "neck grip" allows the partners to have a correct position during ejaculation; however, this position is dangerous and sometimes leads to the death of the female when the couple is inexperienced. Finally, the tigress disengages, frequently turning on the male and attempting to strike him, before entering a resting period.

As with all felines, the penis is covered with barbs (sorts of thorns) that trigger ovulation during penetration. These thorns could be painful for the female, which would explain her violent behaviour at the end of intercourse.

The couple copulates several times, night and day; mating is brief (fifteen to thirty seconds) but can be repeated up to fifty times a day. The interval between mating varies from five to twenty minutes. The rhythm of copulations becomes more frequent from the fifth day onwards, after having reached a peak on the third day.

At nightfall, the pair hunt together. When another male appears, there is a confrontation (this may involve at least some posturing or intimidating facial expressions) and the weaker tiger withdraws. No cases of homosexuality have been observed. The male will mate with any receptive female tiger, even if he is related to her. During the mating period, the tiger remains faithful to the female, even if other tigresses are in estrus at the same time. Once estrus is over, the male will seek to mate with another female.

Pregnancy and parturition 
The length of gestation varies between 93 and 114 days, with an average of 103 days. Pregnancy remains invisible for up to two and a half months, and it is not until the 10th day before birth that the belly is really swollen. The tigress is then more vulnerable to attack and starvation.

The first observation of the number of cubs in a litter dates back to the seventeenth century when the Mughal emperor, Jahangir reported the birth of three young tigers. The female may give birth to one to seven cubs, but the average is two to three. Only two cases of seven tigers being born have been reported, in captivity only. The average in Indian zoos is 2.9 cubs per litter, and in the wild it is 2.98 cubs per litter.

To give birth, the tigress seeks an isolated place, such as a cave, or a place under rocks or under thick forest cover. The ground is simply trampled and there is no special preparation of the den. No observations of births could be made in the wild. Observations in captivity show that the duration of the parturition varies according to the stress state of the tigress. A stressed female will expel her offspring more quickly, so the process can last from one hour to eighteen hours depending on the number of cubs. The tigress licks her vulva and contracts her hindquarters, then stands up to let the cub out, or sometimes sits down and lifts her leg to assist the exit. The interval between parturitions is usually 10 to 20 minutes. Between parturitions, the tigress eats the umbilical cord, amnion and placenta, a protein-rich food.

The mother returns to the estrous cycle eighteen to twenty months after the birth of the cub. The interval between litters varies from twenty months to two and a half years; it has been observed twice that if the litter is lost within the first two weeks after birth, the interval is reduced to eight months.

End of cycle 
A study in Chitwan, Nepal, found infant mortality of 34% for under one year old and 29% for the second year. In the first year, 73% of deaths were due to loss of the entire litter to flood, fire or infanticide. Infanticide is the main cause of death for tigers under one year of age; cubs are sometimes killed by other males who come to take over their father's territory. In the second year, the loss of an entire litter is much rarer, accounting for 29% of deaths. The chances of survival of cubs are greatly enhanced by the experience of the female tiger and the "social" stability of the territory where they are born: a territory maintained for several years by the same male will be more conducive to survival than one that has recently been obtained by a male, or is still coveted by many suitors. It is difficult to know exactly what causes the death of a wild tiger, because of the feline's discreet habits. However, it is known that "wandering" tigers are highly vulnerable to starvation, conspecific and human aggression, while young tigers that have just left their mothers are vulnerable to starvation, intraspecific aggression and hunting injuries.

Data collected in Chitawan and Nagarhole National Parks allow the mortality rate of different tiger "social groups" to be estimated: the youngest (less than 1 year old) are most at risk (40%), followed by "wandering" male (35%) and female (30%) tigers without a territory, and finally male (20%) and female (10%) tigers with a territory. Juvenile tigers (one to two years old) also have a low mortality rate (10%). The lifespan of a tiger is estimated at 26 years in captivity and 8–10 years in the wild, with a high of 15.5 years. The tiger can no longer reproduce after the age of fourteen.

In Nepal, again in the Chitawan, a study over twenty years shows that the average period during which an individual breeds is just over six years for females and less than three years for males. Furthermore, the average number of offspring of a female tiger that survive to independence is 4.54 and only 2 will be incorporated into the breeding population; for a male, the averages are 5.83 and 1.99 offspring respectively. The sex ratio of the tiger is about 1.

The tiger lives longer in the protected environment of the zoo: deaths from starvation or injury are very rare. In 2000, out of 347 tiger deaths in Indian zoos, diseases of the respiratory system (asphyxia, tuberculosis, pneumonia) and digestive system (gastritis, gastroenteritis, gastric ulcer, hepatitis, peritonitis) and behavioural disorders (cannibalism, etc.) accounted for almost 20% of deaths. The majority of deaths occur during winter and the mortality rate in 2000 in Indian zoos was 8.26%.

Influence of captivity 

The tiger reproduces very well in captivity, which leads some zoos to use contraception to regulate populations, and sometimes euthanasia. Alternatively, breeding centers can remove the cubs from tigresses so that they can go back into estrus and "produce" up to three litters a year. Conservatory breeding helps to maintain a living population of tigers regardless of what happens to the wild population, to support in situ conservation programmes and to conduct research into the behaviour and biology of these felines.

In order to keep the species alive in the long term, zoos are organising themselves to maintain the genetic variability of captive specimens by setting up breeding programmes: for example, the Siberian tiger is the subject of a European breeding programme (EEP) and an American programme for threatened species (SSP).

On mating 
The Siberian tiger is the species in captivity with the highest risk of aggression when males and females mate.

Artificial insemination 

Artificial insemination is a possible way of breeding captive tigers, the main advantage being that it is easy to "cross-breed" the different individuals, without having to force a meeting between two tigers. Another advantage would be the ability to collect sperm from a wild specimen. In big felines, semen collection is usually done after electro-ejaculation; semen can be stored at room temperature, 4 °C or frozen. Ovulation must be induced by the veterinarian, for example by injection of gonadotropins. However, artificial inseminations are rarely successful, possibly due to the poor quality of feline semen. The percentage of normal spermatozoa is close to 50% for Sumatran tigers and over 60% for Siberian tigers. A few births have been obtained with fresh semen in intra-vagina l and intrauterine inseminations, the latter method being more efficient.

A European sperm bank of Sumatran and Siberian tigers was initiated by the Zoological Society of London in 2004. Studies conducted by the Hyderabad Centre for Cellular and Molecular Biology (CCMB) show that motility parameters of frozen sperm are poorer (sperm are slower, and their trajectories are less flat), but that the fertility of the semen is not affected.

Hybridisation 

By chance or by force, tigers in captivity sometimes reproduce with felines that they would never encounter in the wild, due to geographical distance or differences in behaviour. Thus, cases of hybridisation between subspecies (crosses between Siberian tigers and Bengal tigers, for example) and with lions have been confirmed. These hybrid felines, called tigons for crosses between a tiger and a lioness and ligers for crosses between a lion and a tigress, are generally sterile but rare cases of reproduction of female hybrids with a tiger or a lion have been reported.

The dogla is a legendary Indian feline often cited in the early 20th century as being the result of natural hybridisation between the tiger and the leopard.

On parturition 
Tigresses are heavily guarded in zoos. Surveillance cameras can be installed in the den where they give birth, and some even accept the presence of humans. Any medical problem can be detected. For example, the unborn tiger may be misplaced and block the passage. In the wild, this would mean death for the tigress and her cubs, but in captivity, it is possible to perform a caesarean section: the tigress Tinka at Servion Zoo was saved in this way. However, a caesarean section makes the udders painful and forces the zoo to bottle-feed the cub.

On breeding 

The rate of abandonment in captivity is high; under certain breeding conditions (e.g. exposure of the female and her cubs) stress is high. The tigress may also be unable to feed her offspring, which sometimes leads facilities that keep tigers to bottle-feed the young, and to care for them by trying to replicate the action of a tigress. For example, to simulate the beneficial effect of the mother's cleansing on the young's digestion and blood circulation, the caretakers use cotton wool soaked in warm water. Another possibility is the "adoption" of tigers by other species, such as dogs or sows.

Notes and references

Notes

References

See also 
 Biological life cycle
 Tiger conservation
 Siberian tiger
 Cross breeding

Bibliography 

 
 
 

Reproduction in animals
Tigers